The U.S. Pro Tennis Championships were played each year from 1927 to 1999 (except 1944). Up to 1967, before the start of the "Open Era", this tournament was regarded as part of the professional grand slam. In 1963 the tournament failed financially but was revived in Boston without a break. It was originally called the National Professional Tennis Championships.

1927
September 23–25, Notlek Tennis Club, Manhattan, New York – Clay

1928
West Side Tennis Club, New York – Grass

1929
West Side Tennis Club, New York – Grass

1930
West Side Tennis Club, New York – Grass

1931
West Side Tennis Club, New York – Grass

1932
South Shore Country Club, Chicago – Clay

1933

1934

1935

1936

1937

1938

1939

1940

1941

1942

1943

1945

See also
 U.S. Pro Tennis Championships draws, 1946–1967
 French Pro Championship draws
 Wembley Professional Championships draws

External links

Tennis in Chicago
Tennis in Cleveland
Tennis in Los Angeles
Tennis tournaments in New York (state)
Tennis tournaments in the United States
Professional tennis tournaments before the Open Era